Pukemanu was a New Zealand television series that ran from 1971 to 1972.

Background
The series, set in a fictional location, was considered to break ground in the way it approached the subject and examined the town that it was set in. It was produced by Tony Isaac.
It was filmed on location in Ātiamuri.

Cast
The series was the first time that Ian Watkin appeared on screen. He played the town doctor. A core cast member was Ernie Leonard who played the part of Charlie Rata. Veteran actress Pat Evison played the part of Phylis Telford.

References

External links
 NZ On Screen: Pukemanu
1970s New Zealand television series
1971 New Zealand television series debuts
1972 New Zealand television series endings